Chloroclystis filata, the filata moth, is a species of moth of the family Geometridae. It is found in New Zealand, the south eastern quarter of Australia and on Norfolk Island. Its host plants are acacias (the blossoms) and Fabaceae (the petals).

References

Chloroclystis
Moths of Australia
Moths of New Zealand
Moths described in 1857